Nukumanu is a Polynesian language, spoken by about 700 people on Nukumanu in the eastern islands of Papua New Guinea. It is one of the most endangered languages in the region.

Vocabulary

References

Further reading

Ellicean languages